Mount St. Mary's School is a Patrician Brothers' School run by the Brothers of St Patrick. It is located in Delhi Cantt, Delhi, India, at 75, Parade Road. The school was established in 1963. The current principal is Bro. Tomy Varghese

History
In 1963, the Brothers of St Patrick opened the school in Delhi at the invitation of the Army. It started with four Brothers, six teachers and 85 students. The first Principal was Bro. E.T Dunne who was in charge of the school till January 1969. The foundation stone was laid on 6 January 1963, by Lt Gen Bhagwati Singh, who was at that time G.O.C of Delhi Area, New Delhi.

The school was first housed in eight tents (with seven classes)- there were only two students in the seventh standard. The building work started immediately, and the entire school moved into the building in July 1963. Two floors were completed in December 1963. This building was however not complete as the number of students were increasing and a Science Block was required. The staff and students organised fetes in 1966 and 1968, which brought in enough money to help complete the building.

Facilities
In addition to two computer labs, two libraries, and three science labs, the school also has sports fields and courts - onesynthetic tennis courts, one soccer fields, a cricket ground, volleyball court,  one outdoor badminton courts and onesynthetic basketball court. In addition to these, there is a science park, skating rink, swimming pool and centrally air-conditioned auditorium with a capacity of nearly one thousand people.

Syllabus
All students are given an education based on the requirements of the Central Board of Secondary Education (CBSE). Religious instruction is imparted to Catholic pupils.

Achievements
In its 50-year history, Mount St. Mary's School has won numerous accolades across sports, co-curriculars and academics. The Ecom-Buzz and Matrix Symposium, a series of inter-school competitions, organized solely by the students has been the recipient of media praise. Students have won an edition of the national level Bournvita Quiz Contest. In 2012, they came fifth nationwide in the Wild Wisdom Quiz, organized by the World Wide Fund for Nature.

Notable alumni
Arnab Goswami Former Editor-in-Chief, Times Now News Channel
Apar Gupta Lawyer and Executive Director, Internet Freedom Foundation
Brahma Chellaney Geostrategist, public intellectual, columnist and author on geostrategic affairs.
Gaurav Kapur TV and Radio Host and Actor
Hitesh Madan Founder and lead guitarist of music band Eka and Euphoria (past)
Jaspreet Jasz Singer
KK Playback Singer
Manan Sharma Cricketer - India U-19 and Delhi State
Raghav Sachar Singer-songwriter, Music composer, Instrumentalist
Shaleen Malhotra Actor
Vinod Khosla Co-founder of Sun Microsystems, Venture capitalist - Khosla Ventures
Aru Krishansh Verma Film Actor

References

External links
Official website

Patrician Brothers schools
Catholic secondary schools in India
Christian schools in Delhi
Educational institutions established in 1963
1963 establishments in Delhi